The Leopaard CT7 is a mid-size pickup truck produced by Changfeng Motor of GAC Group under the Leopaard brand.

Overview

The Leopaard CT7 is debuted at the Beijing Auto Show in April 2016 and is being sold in China since September 2016.

The Leopaard CT7 is powered by either a 1.9 liter turbo inline-4 engine producing 150hp or a 2.4 liter inline-4 engine producing 147hp. With the 1.9 liter turbo engine mated to a 6 speed manual transmission and the 2.4 liter engine mated to a 5 speed manual transmission.

References

Pickup trucks
All-wheel-drive vehicles
Cars introduced in 2016
Trucks of China
Changfeng Motor vehicles